Ri Un-gyong (born 19 November 1980) is a North Korean former football midfielder who played for the North Korea women's national football team at the 2008 Summer Olympics. At the club level, she played for Wolmido.

International goals

See also
 North Korea at the 2008 Summer Olympics

References

External links
 
 

1980 births
Living people
North Korean women's footballers
Place of birth missing (living people)
Footballers at the 2008 Summer Olympics
Olympic footballers of North Korea
Women's association football midfielders
Asian Games medalists in football
Footballers at the 2002 Asian Games
Footballers at the 2006 Asian Games
Footballers at the 2010 Asian Games
Medalists at the 2002 Asian Games
Medalists at the 2006 Asian Games
Medalists at the 2010 Asian Games
North Korea women's international footballers
Asian Games gold medalists for North Korea
Asian Games silver medalists for North Korea
2007 FIFA Women's World Cup players
2003 FIFA Women's World Cup players
21st-century North Korean women